Katherine Patricia Flannery (born June 10, 1964) is an American actress. Following her early theatre work, Flannery had her screen breakthrough playing Meredith Palmer on the NBC series The Office, which won her two Screen Actors Guild Awards. She went on to guest star on CBS shows “Magnum PI, and Young Sheldon. She competed on the 28th season of Dancing with the Stars, and voice of Barb on the animated series Steven Universe.

Early life
Flannery was born in Philadelphia, Pennsylvania, daughter of parents Joan and Tom Flannery, and was raised in the suburb of Ardmore, Pennsylvania. She studied for two years at Shenandoah Conservatory in Virginia and then transferred to the University of the Arts in Philadelphia. She has five sisters and a brother, and is three minutes younger than her twin sister, who is a social worker.

Career
A former member of The Second City's National Touring Company, Flannery is an original member of Chicago's Annoyance Theater, where she appeared in over 15 shows including The Miss Vagina Pageant and The Real Live Brady Bunch. 

The Lampshades, her cult comedy lounge act with veteran improviser Scot Robinson, has been running in Hollywood and in comedy festivals all over the country since 2001 and was seen at the U.S. Comedy Arts Festival in Aspen, Colorado. The Lampshades was New York magazine's "LA Pick" for 2006, and was declared "Best Saturday Comedy Show of the Year" by LA Weekly.

Flannery appeared as the alcoholic, divorced, single mother Meredith Palmer on the television comedy The Office. Before The Office, she made appearances on The Bernie Mac Show, Boomtown, Curb Your Enthusiasm, and Jimmy Kimmel Live!. The Office earned her and the rest of its cast acclaim, along with several accolades, such as winning two Screen Actors Guild Awards for Outstanding Performance by an Ensemble in a Comedy Series, with an additional five nominations for the same award. In 2008, Flannery was a talent scout on Last Comic Standing with her Office costar Brian Baumgartner, and she appeared with the cast of The Office on Celebrity Family Feud. 

In 2010, she played Harper's mom on the Disney Channel's Wizards of Waverly Place as Elaine Finkle. Flannery also appeared as a judge in a 2009 episode of Iron Chef America. Flannery has been touring with Jane Lynch as her sidekick on stage since 2013 in her show See Jane Sing with Tim Davis and the Tony Guerrero Quintet, playing the Kennedy Center, Joe's Pub, the Borgata and 30 cities. 

Flannery was in the long running New York hit, Nora Ephron's Love, Loss, and What I Wore. She also played Neely O'Hara in the 1996 off-Broadway hit Valley of the Dolls , an adaptation of the 1967 film at the Circle in the Square Theatre in New York City and Los Angeles. Also in Los Angeles, she played the teen prostitute and Blair's sister in The Phacts of Life at the Renberg Theatre and in the Lily Tomlin/Jane Wagner production of Three Feet Under at The Evidence Room. Jane Lynch's Christmas album A Swingin' Little Christmas features Kate Flannery, and reached #8 on the Billboard top 100 charts.

She also appeared on The Jay Leno Show portraying Wendy in a skit at the time of the burger chain's 40th anniversary. She was a contestant on 19 episodes of Celebrity Name Game, two episodes of Hollywood Game Night with Jane Lynch. Flannery also appeared on Don't Forget the Lyrics and hosted Standup in Stilettos for two seasons on the TV Guide network. She is the former musical director of the Los Angeles Drama Club, teaching Shakespeare to children and young adults.

In 2016, she recurred on ABC's American Housewife as Crossing Guard Sandy, played a janitor in an episode of Brooklyn Nine-Nine, appeared on FOX's New Girl and MTV's Mary + Jane, and in 2017, recurred on Cartoon Network's Steven Universe as Barbara "Barb" Miller. Flannery was a member of the band Mono Puff under the stage name "Lady Puff". She toured with the band and sang on their second album, It's Fun to Steal.

In 2019, Flannery was announced as one of the celebrities to compete on season 28 of Dancing with the Stars. She was partnered with first-time professional Pasha Pashkov and was eliminated fifth. She joined the show's live tour in 2020, but it was cut short due to the COVID-19 pandemic.

Filmography

Film

Television

Dancing with the Stars performances 

1 Score given by guest judge Leah Remini.

Awards and nominations

References

External links
 
 The Lampshades, Flannery's comedy lounge act

1964 births
Living people
American film actresses
American television actresses
American people of Irish descent
Actresses from Philadelphia
American women comedians
University of the Arts (Philadelphia) alumni
20th-century American actresses
21st-century American actresses
American twins
20th-century American comedians
21st-century American comedians